The 2015 Five Star Movement presidential primary election was held online in January 2015 to determine the Five Star Movement candidate in the 2015 Italian presidential election.

Ferdinando Imposimato, former Member of the Parliament and honorary president of Supreme Court of Cassation, won the primary with a plurality of the vote, but ultimately lost the presidential election to Sergio Mattarella, coming in second on the fourth ballot.

Candidates

Results

See also 
2013 Five Star Movement presidential primary election

References 

2013 elections in Italy
Five Star Movement
March 2013 events in Italy